Paremata is a suburb of Porirua, on the Tasman Sea coast to the north of Wellington, New Zealand.

History

Early history
The modern suburb, just south of Plimmerton, derives its name from the "Paremata Barracks", erected on the north shore of Porirua Harbour in about 1846 when the British Empire was nervous about the local Ngati Toa tribe under its leader Te Rauparaha. The stone barracks were largely destroyed by an earthquake in 1848.

The Wellington and Manawatu Railway Company built a station nearby, towards the end of the 19th century. In 1936 a road bridge finally spanned the entrance to the Pauatahanui Inlet, greatly easing access to Wellington for the growing suburb. After a coast road was built between Pukerua Bay and Paekakariki further north, the route through Paremata became part of State Highway 1. Later developments to ease congestion included the Paremata Roundabout, just south of the road bridge, reducing some of the distress that was occasionally caused at what came to be known as "Glass Corner".

During World War II, United States soldiers were stationed near the barracks, on land that later became the Ngatitoa Domain.

Recent history
With the building of the new Paremata Railway Station across the inlet, the locality south of the road and rail bridges took on the name Paremata as well. The street along the original shoreline had been known as "The Crescent" for decades, but by the end of the 20th century it was commonly called "Paremata Crescent".

The area to the north, which included a subdivision called "Dolly Varden" (named after a Charles Dickens character), is now called Mana because the new Mana Railway Station a little further north was given that name; probably because it is the first point on the rail journey north at which travellers get a view of Mana Island.  Current maps identify the areas to the north of the road & rail bridges as 'Mana' and the areas to the south as 'Paremata', matching the naming of the railway stations and streets.

By the start of the 21st century, several members of the Ngati Toa tribe had served on the Porirua City Council, and the whole locality around the Ngatitoa Domain had become a busy suburb and fishing base with housing and commerce. A new suburb, Papakowhai, has grown on the hills to the south, while the large suburb of Whitby has developed to the east, with its main access via  from the Paremata Roundabout.

In August 2004 a new road bridge was opened for northbound traffic, allowing southbound traffic to use both lanes of the old bridge. This is part of an ongoing project by Transit New Zealand to solve congestion issues and improve safety of motorists, pedestrians and local residents accessing SH 1 from side-roads and driveways. By July 2006 a series of traffic lights had been installed along Mana Esplanade, along with two transit lanes. A second feeder roundabout had been constructed on SH 58 allowing easier access to Whitby.

The SH 1 route through Paremata was renumbered  on 7 December 2021, due to SH 1 being shifted to the Transmission Gully Motorway.

Demographics

Paremata had a population of 2,463 at the 2018 New Zealand census, an increase of 90 people (3.8%) since the 2013 census, and an increase of 183 people (8.0%) since the 2006 census. There were 972 households. There were 1,185 males and 1,275 females, giving a sex ratio of 0.93 males per female. The median age was 46.7 years (compared with 37.4 years nationally), with 411 people (16.7%) aged under 15 years, 360 (14.6%) aged 15 to 29, 1,218 (49.5%) aged 30 to 64, and 474 (19.2%) aged 65 or older.

Ethnicities were 89.6% European/Pākehā, 11.9% Māori, 5.8% Pacific peoples, 4.1% Asian, and 2.2% other ethnicities (totals add to more than 100% since people could identify with multiple ethnicities).

The proportion of people born overseas was 22.7%, compared with 27.1% nationally.

Although some people objected to giving their religion, 55.4% had no religion, 35.3% were Christian, 0.4% were Hindu, 0.2% were Muslim, 0.5% were Buddhist and 2.4% had other religions.

Of those at least 15 years old, 699 (34.1%) people had a bachelor or higher degree, and 183 (8.9%) people had no formal qualifications. The median income was $47,900, compared with $31,800 nationally. The employment status of those at least 15 was that 1,140 (55.6%) people were employed full-time, 288 (14.0%) were part-time, and 66 (3.2%) were unemployed.

Education

See also
Fort Parramatta

References

External links
Paremata Roundabout Webcam
Map of Paremata Region - ZoomIn.co.nz
SH1 Plimmerton - Paremata Upgrade Information
Paremata-Postgate Community Profile from Statistics NZ
Paremata in the Cyclopaedia of New Zealand (1897, ETC)

 
Suburbs of Porirua